This is a list of private fee-charging schools in Ireland.

Primary schools (some with pre-school also)

Leinster
Headfort School, Kells, County Meath

Dublin

Munster
 Scoil Mhuire, Cork
 Christian Brothers College, Cork

Secondary schools
In 2016, there were 51 fee-charging private second level schools in Ireland, which as of the academic year 2014/15, had 24,112 students enrolled.

Annual day fees are typically between €4,000 to €7,000; however the cost of boarding can increase these fees significantly, up to more than €15,000 for the school year. In 2012, fee-charging schools in Ireland took in €121 million in fees out of a total revenue of €227 million.

Connacht
Sligo Grammar School
Yeats College

Leinster
Cistercian College, Roscrea
Clongowes Wood College
Drogheda Grammar School
Dundalk Grammar School
Leinster Senior College
Newbridge College
Wilson's Hospital School
Kilkenny College

Dublin

Munster
Bandon Grammar School
Christian Brothers College, Cork
Glenstal Abbey School
Limerick Tutorial College
Midleton College
Presentation Brothers College, Cork
Rockwell College
Villiers School
Scoil Mhuire, Cork

See also
Education in the Republic of Ireland
List of schools in the Republic of Ireland

Notes

References

Schools in the Republic of Ireland
Fee paying
Ireland
Republic